CFE may refer to:

Education
 Campaign for Fiscal Equity, a non-profit organization for funding education in New York City
 Certified Fraud Examiner, a designation awarded by the Association of Certified Fraud Examiners
 , a school in Mexico City
 Common Final Examination, the final examination for Chartered Professional Accountant students in Canada
 Curriculum for Excellence, the national curriculum for Scottish schools

Military
 Canadian Forces Europe
 Central Fighter Establishment, a Royal Air Force formation
 Conventional Forces in Europe, two NATO/Warsaw Pact treaties:
 Treaty on Conventional Armed Forces in Europe, established limits on conventional military equipment in Europe
 Adapted Conventional Armed Forces in Europe Treaty, signed on November 19, 1999, during Istanbul summit

Other organizations
 CFE (Belgium), a Belgian construction company
 CFE Company, producer of the CFE738 turbofan engine
 Chaco For Ever, an Argentine football club
 Chicago Board Options Exchange Futures Exchange (CFE)
 Chicago, Fort Wayne and Eastern Railroad, railroad service (reporting mark)
 Clermont-Ferrand Auvergne Airport (IATA airport code), airport serving French city of Clermont-Ferrand
 , the Mexican state-owned electric power utility
 , an organization of European tax advisers and their national organizations
 Council of Five Elders, a government council of feudal Japan

Other uses
 CFE Arena, arena in Orlando, Florida, University of Central Florida
 Capcom Fighting Evolution, a 2004 video game from Capcom
 Common Firmware Environment, a bootloader developed by Broadcom for their system-on-a-chip products
 Compiler frontend, the part of a computer compiler that verifies syntax and semantics
 Continued fraction expansion, a continued fraction written as its integer members only
 BA CityFlyer, a subsidiary of British Airways (ICAO code)